Voshmgir may refer to:
Voshmgir, alternate name of Pichak Mahalleh
Voshmgir District